This list of railway accidents in Sri Lanka provides details of significant railway crashes in Sri Lanka involving railway rolling stock.

Other than these, a number of accidents have taken place. One major type is elephant accidents, which typically occur in the North-Central area. Other accidents occur at unsecured level crossings with road traffic.

Worst accidents

The worst accident was the 2004 Sri Lanka tsunami-rail disaster with more than 1700 people died by tsunami wave which followed the 2004 Indian Ocean earthquake.

1900s
 12 March 1928 – A passenger train and a mixed train collided near Kalutara killing 28 people.
 23 May 1958 – Night mail train derailed at Batticaloa, killing 3 and injuring several others.
 18 March 1964 – 60 people died in a derailment at Mirigama.
 19 January 1985 – 11 passengers were killed by LTTE bomb attack. Yal Devi train was attacked.
 October 1985 – A freight train from Trincomalee to Colombo got a bomb attack by LTTE. Class M2 No. 571 locomotive was destroyed in this incident.
 24 July 1996 – 70 people died. A train was bombed by LTTE at Dehiwala.
 4 December 1996 – LTTE attacked another train on the Trincomalee Line. Class M6 No. 7981 locomotive was destroyed in this incident.

2000s

 19 August 2001 – A train derailed due to high speed and overcrowding, killing 46 people, between Alawwa and Rambukkana.
 January 2002 – The Intercity Express heading to Colombo from Kandy derails near Rambukkana causing more than 15 deaths. The accident was due to malfunctioning of the braking system.
 13 June 2002 – Train derails whilst coming into Alawwa railway station, killing 14 people.
 26 December 2004 – 2004 tsunami rail disaster. At Peraliya, approximately 2685 died in the world's biggest rail disaster as a train is overwhelmed by the tsunami created by the 2004 Indian Ocean earthquake.
 26 April 2005 – Polgahawela level crossing collision, a private bus tries to beat another bus and the train at a level crossing in Yangalmodara close to Polgahawela crashed. 37 of commuters died, all on the bus.
 17 September 2011 – 2011 Alawwa rail accident, near Alawwa railway station, two trains (intercity express train no 1029 Colombo to Kandy and a Class S11 DMU) collided killing 5 persons and injuring over 30 people.
 17 May 2012 – Two trains (after one train crashing in to a stopped train) collided between the Wandurawa and Keenawala railway stations in Veyangoda.
 30 April 2014 – An Intercity Express train to north and the Colombo bound Rajarata Rajina train collided at Pothuhera, injuring 68 passengers.
 5 February 2018 - A train travelling between Colombo and Galle collided with a truck at Angulana, killing four people and seriously injuring two others.
28 August 2019 - Two trains travelling between Colombo Fort and Maradana stations (Fort-Chilaw) and (Maradana-Kalutara) collided head on at around 10:20 AM, with no injuries.
01 February 2022 - Four of same family dead as three-wheeler fatally collides with Rajarata Rajina at Rillamba Junction in Boossa.

See also
 Locomotives of Sri Lanka Railways
 Sri Lanka Railways

References

External links
 Sri Lanka Railways
 Pothuhera Train Accident 2014

Sri Lanka
Sri Lanka transport-related lists